The Copa Dr. Carlos Ibarguren, also called Campeonato Argentino or simply Copa Ibarguren was an official Argentine football cup competition contested between 1913 and 1958. Between 1913 and 1925, the winner of the cup received the honor to be the "Argentine Champion". That is because the cup faced the two strongest champions of the country, represented by the Buenos Aires league (Primera División) and the Rosario league (with its affiliated teams competing in Copa Nicasio Vila, the main division of LRF).

History 
The trophy was donated by the Argentine Minister of Public Instruction Dr. Carlos Ibarguren to be played between the champions of all of the regional leagues in Argentina. The cup was only ever contested as a one off game between:

 1913–1938: Primera División vs Liga Rosarina
 1939: Primera División vs Litoral league
 1940–1941: Primera División vs Asociación Rosarina
 1942–1958: Primera División vs Copa Presidente de la Nación

List of champions

Finals
The following list includes all the editions of the Copa Ibarguren:

Notes

Titles by team

Notes

References

Ibarguren
Recurring events established in 1913
Recurring events disestablished in 1958
1913 establishments in Argentina